Bertrand Gille may refer to:

Bertrand Gille (historian) (1920–1980), French historian of technology
Bertrand Gille (handballer) (born 1978), French Olympic handball player